David John Fagan (born 13 March 1938) was a Scottish footballer who played for Albion Rovers, St Mirren and Dumbarton.

References

1938 births
Scottish footballers
St Mirren F.C. players
Dumbarton F.C. players
Albion Rovers F.C. players
Scottish Football League players
Living people
Association football wing halves